Miss Hickory is a 1946 novel by Carolyn Sherwin Bailey that won the Newbery Medal for excellence in American children's literature in 1947.

Plot introduction
The protagonist is Miss Hickory, a doll made from a forked twig from an apple tree and a hickory nut for her head (hence her name).  She lives in a tiny doll house made of corncobs outside the home of her human owners. Her world is shaken when the family decides to spend the winter in Boston, Massachusetts, but leave her behind. Miss Hickory is aided during the long cold winter by several farm and forest animals. Prickly and a little stubborn, she slowly learns to accept help from others, and to offer some assistance herself.

External links

The Newbery Companion by John Thomas Gillespie and Corinne J. Naden, Libraries Unlimited, 2001, Miss Hickory, pages 141–4, synopsis, themes and background.
A reference site for Carolyn Sherwin Bailey's book Miss Hickory

Newbery Medal–winning works
1946 American novels
American children's novels
Children's fantasy novels
Sentient toys in fiction
Viking Press books
1946 children's books